Kalimpong College, established in 1962, is the oldest college in Kalimpong, Darjeeling. It offers undergraduate courses in arts, commerce and science. It is affiliated with the University of North Bengal.

Departments

Science

Chemistry
Physics
Mathematics
Botany
Zoology

Arts and Commerce

English
Nepali
Hindi
History
Geography
Political Science
Philosophy
Economics
Tourism and Travel Management
Commerce and Management

Accreditation
The college is recognized by the University Grants Commission (UGC). It has been re-accredited and awarded B grade by the National Assessment and Accreditation Council (NAAC).

See also

References

External links
 Kalimpong College
University of North Bengal
University Grants Commission
National Assessment and Accreditation Council

Universities and colleges in Kalimpong district
Colleges affiliated to University of North Bengal
Kalimpong
Educational institutions established in 1962
1962 establishments in West Bengal